Neil Gallagher (born 20 January 1985) is an Irish sportsperson. He plays Gaelic football for Louth and Cooley Kickhams (Club) association football for Dundalk.

Born in Newry, County Down, Gallagher started playing as a goalkeeper for Gaelic sides Cooley Kickhams and Louth Minors and joined Louth Seniors in 2009 as a goalkeeper. In his school days he played for St. Marys College in Dundalk, winning both football and soccer Leinster titles. He began his soccer career with local side Bellurgan United but signed semi pro for Dundalk F.C. He then got a scholarship to UCD playing under Paul Doolin and Pete Mahon.
He joined Dundalk in January 2006 from UCD.

He was signed for his third spell at the club by Seán Connor in March 2009.

In 2016, Gallagher was a member of the management team of the successful Cooley Kickhams under 21 side that defeated the Geraldines in the U-21 championship final on a scoreline of 3-07 to 8 points.

References

1985 births
Living people
People from Dundalk
Gaelic footballers who switched code
Gaelic football goalkeepers
Louth inter-county Gaelic footballers
Cooley Kickhams Gaelic footballers
Association football goalkeepers
Republic of Ireland association footballers
League of Ireland players
University College Dublin A.F.C. players
Dundalk F.C. players
Longford Town F.C. players
People educated at St Mary's College, Dundalk